Lorena Braga Gomes Simpson aka " Lorena Simpson" (born March 30, in Manaus) is a Brazilian singer, dancer, and songwriter born in Manaus, Amazonas. She is the biggest and most awarded Brazilian artist in the electronic music scene. She became well-know for hits such as "Brand New Day" and "Can't Stop Loving You”. 

She has performed in music festivals and events in Brazil, Latin America, Europe and the United States, moving a whole generation to dance floors around the world. Lorena is considered a pioneer. She is responsible for changing the market of shows in Brazil, while also creating a great impact inside the LGBTQI+ community. She has become an inspiration for other Brazilian artists from different genres, who now follow her shows and performance model.

After 10 years of building an established name in the electronic music scene, several awards and hundreds of shows around the globe, she started working on her new sound "Amazonian Pop" which is a mix of pop music and sounds and rhythms influenced by her native culture from her hometown the city of Manaus located in the middle of the Amazon rainforest. 

Lorena has been developing her "Amazonian Pop" sound since 2018 and in 2020, she released her single in Portuguese “Chama Que Vem” written by Vitao, which was well received by critics and fans. The music video was shot in the middle of the Amazon rainforest, where she was born and raised, creating a perfect scenario for the song and her music. After her first Pop Amazônico release was born, the term "Pop Amazônico" has been used by other artists from the north, almost creating a new lane and genre of pop music in Brazil.  

Currently, she has been working on developing her new music , while also creating new opportunities and collaborating with other artists. 

Over the years, Lorena has collaborated with many music producers and Djs, resulting in over 20 featured songs and over 35 million streams and views on digital platforms such as Spotify, Youtube and Deezer

Bio 
Lorena Simpson was born in the city of Manaus, capital of the state of Amazonas. She is a descendant of Portuguese on her mother's side and Irish on her father's side[1].  Since she was young she always dreamed of being an artist, even though she had difficulties imposed by the demographic location, she never gave up on her dreams and kept fighting for her goals. At the age of 17, Lorena left her hometown for the big cities in search of improvement in the art of dance, and after years working professionally as a dancer in television programs, commercials and other projects, she started her solo career as a singer.

Career 
At the age of 17, Lorena started her career as a professional dancer. She performed on several television productions, commercials, movies and also tours with other artists including the Brazilian singer Kelly Key. Lorena was handpicked by the renowned talent manager Marlene Mattos for Kelly’s tour.

In 2008, with years of experience in the entertainment industry as a dancer, she started her singing career with the release of her first single "Feel da Funk" produced by Mr. Jam. In the same year, in collaboration with DJ and producer Filipe Guerra, she released the songs "Can't Stop Loving You" and "Brand New Day”. Those hits were responsible for establishing her in the Brazilian electronic music scene and making Lorena Simpson's name a national brand.

In 2010, Lorena’s music was playing in countries around the world. Her tours went all over Brazil and 7 other countries, including Panama, Chile, the United States, and Europe. She was among the five most played artists in Mexico that year, while also being nominated as "Ambassador of Gender Equality" in the country.  In 2013, she released her first EP " Lorena Simpson" consisting of four tracks. The song "This Moment" was the first release produced by Yinon Yahel, known for working with great artists like Offer Nissim, Jennifer Lopez and Madonna.

Due to the success of her shows, the artist began to receive invitations to collaborate with other artists on the rise at the time, such as Anitta, Pabllo Vittar, Lexa and Ludmilla.

In 2014, she recreated Britney Spears' 2003 MTV Video Music Awards performance of the song "I'm a Slave 4 U" together with singer Anitta during the Chá da Alice event in Rio de Janeiro causing a lot attention from the press.

Completing 10 years of career in the electronic scene, several awards and more than 600 shows around the world, Lorena decided to make changes including  adding songs in Portuguese to her repertoire. Her first single in Portuguese was " Eu Quero Mais" in 2018.

In 2020, Lorena released the song "Chama Que Vem", written by Vitão, which has influences of sounds and rhythms of the Amazonian indigenous and folk culture. The music video was shot in her hometown of Manaus, which is located in the center of the Amazon rainforest.  Also in 2020, Lorena was invited to be featured on Pablo Vittar's new album "Deluxe111”, with the official remix of the song "Flash Pose”. The song being one of the most heard tracks on the album.

Lorena Simpson is an artist who continues to amaze audiences with her authenticity and international level of performance. She is also a big supporter of LGBT causes and for more visibility of the art and culture of state of Amazonas.

Singles 

 "Eu Quero Mais"
Released: 2018

 "Bem Melhor"
Released: 2018

 Kayky, Lorena Simpson
Album: "Nós dois"
Released: 2019

 "Bate Leque"
Released: 2019

 "Vantagem"
Released: 2020

"Easy"
Released: 2020

 "Make Me Go"
Released: 2020

 "Chama Que Vem"
Released: 2020

As featured artist

Tours 
 2008–2009: Breathe Again
 2010–2011: Dreams Tour
 2012-2013: Neo Time Tour
 2014–2015: To The Ground Tour 
 2015–2016: House Of Pop
hey hey tour
@tour
LS Lovers Tour

Music videos

Awards

Top Music Brasil
2009
 Best National Dance Music
 New Artist

Ômega HitZ Awards
2010
National Dance Performance
Dance Music of the Year (for "Breathe Again")
Dance Show of the Year

DJSound Award
2011
Best Show Dancing

2012
National Dance Single Female (for "Jump Up")
Sexual Diversity Ambassador in México City

2010

PapoMix Diversidade 
2011
Best Female Singer

Jovem Brasileiro
2012
 Best Singer Electronic Music

References

External links 
Official website

1987 births
Living people
People from Manaus
Brazilian people of Irish descent
Brazilian women pop singers
English-language singers from Brazil
21st-century Brazilian singers
21st-century Brazilian women singers